Kuthuparamba State assembly constituency is one of the 140 state legislative assembly constituencies in Kerala state in southern India.  It is also one of the 7 state legislative assembly constituencies included in the Vatakara Lok Sabha constituency.
 As of the 2021 assembly elections, the current MLA is K. P Mohanan of Loktantrik Janata Dal.

Local self-governed segments
7 out of the 9 local bodies included as a part of 2008 Delimitation in the current Kuthuparamba constituency were parts of the erstwhile Peringalam constituency before 2008 delimitation. In 2015, the Gram panchayats of Panoor, Peringalam, and Kariyad were merged to form Panoor Municipality.

Kuthuparamba Niyamasabha constituency is composed of the following local self governed segments:

Members of Legislative Assembly 
The following list contains all members of Kerala legislative assembly who have represented the constituency:

Key

     

* indicates by-polls

Election results

Niyamasabha Election 2021

Niyamasabha Election 2016 
There were 1,81,095 registered voters in the constituency for the 2016 election.

Niyamasabha Election 2011 
There were 1,60,335 registered voters in the constituency for the 2011 election.

See also
 Kuthuparamba
 Peringalam (State Assembly constituency)
 Kannur district
 List of constituencies of the Kerala Legislative Assembly
 2016 Kerala Legislative Assembly election

References 

Assembly constituencies of Kerala

State assembly constituencies in Kannur district